The 2013 North Indian Ocean cyclone season was an average season during the period of tropical cyclone formation in the North Indian Ocean. The season began in May with the formation of Cyclone Viyaru, which made landfall on Bangladesh, destroying more than 26,500 houses. After a period of inactivity, Cyclone Phailin formed in October, and became an extremely severe cyclonic storm. Additionally, it was a Category 5-equivalent cyclone on the Saffir–Simpson hurricane wind scale. It then made landfall in the Indian states of Andhra Pradesh and Odisha, becoming the most intense cyclone to strike the country since the 1999 Odisha cyclone. In November, cyclones Helen and Lehar formed, and they both made landfall in Andhra Pradesh just one week away from each other. The latter also affected the Andaman and Nicobar Islands.

This timeline documents all the events of this season, including the strengthening, weakening, formation, dissipation, and landfall of tropical cyclones in both the Bay of Bengal and the Arabian Sea. When depressions form in the Bay of Bengal, they receive the prefix BOB by the India Meteorological Department (IMD). Likewise, depressions which form in the Arabian Sea are designated the prefix ARB, and those which form over land are given the prefix LAND.  The Joint Typhoon Warning Center (JTWC) also creates advisories on storms in the North Indian Ocean. It designates the prefix B for storms that form in the Bay of Bengal, and the prefix A for those which form in the Arabian Sea.  Best track data from the IMD and JTWC is utilized in this article, which means that post-storm analyses take precedence over operational advisories and the like. Meteorologists use one time zone, Coordinated Universal Time (UTC), when issuing forecasts and advisories. As such, the time of the events in this season are listed in UTC as well as the local time, which is, in this case, Indian Standard Time (IST).

Timeline of events

May

10 May

 00:00 UTC (5:30 a.m. IST) at   The JTWC reports that Tropical Depression 01B has formed.
 06:00 UTC (11:30 a.m. IST) at   The JTWC reports that Tropical Depression 01B has intensified into a tropical storm.
 09:00 UTC (2:30 p.m. IST) at   The IMD reports that Depression BOB 01 has formed.
 12:00 UTC (5:30 p.m. IST) at   The IMD reports that Depression BOB 01 has intensified into a deep depression.

11 May

 03:00 UTC (8:30 a.m. IST) at   The IMD reports that Deep Depression BOB 01 has strengthened into Cyclonic Storm Viyaru.
06:00 UTC (11:30 a.m.

15 May

 06:00 UTC (11:30 a.m.

16 May

 08:00 UTC (1:30 p.m.
 12:00 UTC (5:30 p.m. IST) at   The IMD reports that Cyclonic Storm Viyaru has weakened to a deep depression.
 18:00 UTC (11:30 p.m. IST) at   The IMD reports that Deep Depression Viyaru has degenerated into a depression.

17 May

 00:00 (5:30 a.m. IST)  The IMD reports that Depression Viyaru has weakened to a well-marked low pressure area over Nagaland.

29 May

 03:00 UTC (8:30 a.m.
 13:3014:30 UTC (7:008:00 IST) at   The IMD reports that Depression BOB 02 has crossed the West Bengal coast.

30 May

 03:00 UTC (8:30 a.m.

31 May

 12:00 UTC (5:30 p.m. IST)  The IMD reports that Depression BOB 02 has degenerated into a well-marked low pressure area over Bihar and Jharkhand.

July

30 July

 03:00 UTC (8:30 a.m.
 07:00 UTC (12:30 p.m. IST)  The IMD reports that Depression BOB 03 has crossed the North Odisha and the West Bengal coast between Balasore and Digha.

August

1 August

 03:00 UTC (8:30 a.m. IST)  The IMD reports that Depression BOB 03 has weakened into a well-marked low pressure area over southeast Madhya Pradesh and neighboring Chhattisgarh and Vidarbha.

20 August

 03:00 UTC (8:30 a.m.

23 August

 03:00 UTC (8:30 a.m. IST)  The IMD reports that Depression LAND 01 has become a well-marked low-pressure area over the central area of south Madhya Pradesh and Vidarbha.

October

7 October 

 18:00 UTC (11:30 p.m. IST) at   The JTWC reports that a tropical depression has formed in the Bay of Bengal.

8 October

 03:00 UTC (8:30 a.m. IST) at   The IMD reports that Depression BOB 04 has formed.

9 October

 00:00 UTC (5:30 a.m. IST) at   The IMD reports that Depression BOB 04 has strengthened into a deep depression.
 12:00 UTC (5:30 p.m. IST) at   The IMD reports that Deep Depression BOB 04 has strengthened into a cyclonic storm and is subsequently named Phailin.

10 October

 03:00 UTC (8:30 a.m. IST) at   The IMD reports that Cyclonic Storm Phailin has become a severe cyclonic storm.
 06:00 UTC (11:30 a.m. IST) at   The IMD reports that Severe Cyclonic Storm Phailin has rapidly intensified into a very severe cyclonic storm.
15:00 UTC (8:30 a.m. IST) at   The IMD reports that Very Severe Cyclonic Storm Phailin has quickly strengthened into an extremely severe cyclonic storm.

11 October

 03:00 UTC (8:30 a.m.

12 October

 17:00 UTC (10:30 p.m. IST) at   The IMD reports that Extremely Severe Cyclonic Storm Phailin has made landfall over Odisha and the north Andhra Pradesh coast.

13 October

 00:00 UTC (5:30 a.m. IST) at   The IMD reports that Extremely Severe Cyclonic Storm Phailin has weakened to a very severe cyclonic storm.
03:00 UTC (8:30 a.m. IST) at   The IMD reports that Very Severe Cyclonic Storm Phailin has weakened to a severe cyclonic storm.
 06:00 UTC (11:30 a.m. IST) at   The IMD reports that Severe Cyclonic Storm Phailin has weakened to a cyclonic storm.
 18:00 UTC (11:30 p.m. IST) at   The IMD reports that Cyclonic Storm Phailin has degenerated into a deep depression.

14 October

 03:00 UTC (8:30 a.m. IST) at   The IMD reports that Deep Depression Phailin has degenerated into a depression.
 09:00 UTC (2:30 p.m. IST)  The IMD reports that Depression Phailin has weakened to a well-marked low pressure area over southwest Bihar and the areas surrounding it.

November

8 November

 06:00 UTC (11:30 a.m. IST) at   The IMD reports that Depression ARB 01 has formed.

9 November

 00:00 UTC(5:30 a.m.

10 November

 23:0000:00 UTC (4:305:30 a.m. IST 11 November) at   The IMD reports tha tDeep Depression ARB 01 has made landfall on the coast of Somalia.

11 November 

 06:00 UTC (11:30 a.m. IST) at   The IMD reports that Deep Depression ARB 01 has weakened to a depression.
 12:00 UTC (5:30 p.m. IST)  The IMD reports that Depression ARB 01 has weakened to a well-marked low pressure area over Somalia.

13 November

 00:00 UTC (5:30 a.m. IST) at   The IMD reports that Depression BOB 05 has formed.
 12:00 UTC (5:30 p.m.

16 November

 07:30 UTC (1:00 p.m. IST)  The IMD reports that Depression BOB 05 has made landfall on the Tamil Nadu coast near Nagapattinam.

17 November

 00:00 UTC (5:30 a.m. IST)  The IMD reports that Depression BOB 05 has weakened to a well-marked low pressure area over northern Tamil Nadu and the areas surrounding it.

19 November

 00:00 UTC (5:30 a.m. IST) at   The IMD reports that Depression BOB 06 has formed.
 15:00 UTC (8:30 p.m. IST) at   The IMD reports that Depression BOB 06 has intensified into a deep depression.

20 November

 03:00 UTC (8:30 a.m. IST) at   The IMD reports that Deep Depression BOB 06 has strengthened into a cyclonic storm, receiving the name Helen from the IMD.

21 November

 00:00 UTC (5:30 a.m. IST) at   The IMD reports that Cyclonic Storm Helen has intensified into a severe cyclonic storm.
 06:00 UTC (11:30 a.m.

22 November

 08:0009:00 UTC (1:302:30 p.m. IST) at   The IMD reports that Severe Cyclonic Storm Helen has made landfall on the Andhra Pradesh coast in south Machilliptnam.
 09:00 UTC (2:30 p.m. IST) at   The IMD reports that Severe Cyclonic Storm Helen has weakened to a cyclonic storm.
 12:00 UTC (5:30 p.m. IST) at   The IMD reports that Cyclonic Storm Helen has weakened to a deep depression.
 18:00 UTC (11:30 p.m. IST) at   The IMD reports that Deep Depression Helen has weakened to a depression.

23 November

 00:00 UTC (5:30 a.m. IST)  The IMD reports that Depression Helen has degenerated to a well-marked low pressure area over coastal Andhra Pradesh and the areas surrounding it.
 12:00 UTC (5:30 p.m. IST) at   The IMD reports that Depression BOB 07 has formed.
 18:00 UTC (11:30 p.m. IST) at   The IMD reports that Depression BOB 07 has rapidly strengthened into a deep depression.

24 November

 00:00 UTC (5:30 a.m. IST) at   The IMD reports that Deep Depression BOB 07 has rapidly intensified into a cyclonic storm. It is named Lehar by the IMD.

25 November

 00:00 UTC (5:30 a.m. IST) at   The IMD reports that Cyclonic Storm Lehar has made landfall on the Andaman and Nicobar Islands south of Port Blair, and simultaneously becomes a severe cyclonic storm.
 21:00 UTC (2:30 a.m. IST 26 November) at   The IMD reports that Severe Cyclonic Storm Lehar has become a very severe cyclonic storm.

26 November

 18:00 UTC (11:30 p.m.

27 November

 12:00 UTC (5:30 p.m. IST) at   The IMD reports that Very Severe Cyclonic Storm Lehar has weakened to a severe cyclonic storm.
 18:00 UTC (11:30 p.m. IST) at   The IMD reports that Severe Cyclonic Storm Lehar has weakened to a cyclonic storm.

28 November

 00:00 UTC (5:30 a.m. IST) at   The IMD reports that Cyclonic Storm Lehar has weakened to a deep depression.
 08:30 UTC (2:00 p.m. IST) at   The IMD reports that Deep Depression Lehar has made landfall on Andhra Pradesh close to Machilipatnam.
 09:00 UTC (2:30 p.m. IST) at   The IMD reports that Deep Depression Lehar has weakened to a depression.
 18:00 UTC (11:30 p.m. IST)  The IMD reports that Depression Lehar has weakened to a well-marked low-pressure area over coastal Andhra Pradesh and adjoining Telangana.

December

6 December

 03:00 UTC (8:30 a.m. IST) at   The IMD reports that Depression BOB 08 has formed.
 18:00 UTC (11:30 p.m. IST) at   The IMD reports that Depression BOB 08 has intensified into a deep depression.

7 December

 00:00 UTC (5:30 a.m. IST) at    The IMD reports that Deep Depression BOB 08 has rapidly intensified into a cyclonic storm, receiving the name Madi from the IMD.
 09:00 UTC (2:30 p.m. IST) at   The IMD reports that Cyclonic Storm Madi has strengthened into a severe cyclonic storm.

8 December

 06:00 UTC (11:30 a.m.

9 December

 12:00 UTC (5:30 p.m. IST) at   The IMD reports that Very Severe Cyclonic Storm Madi has weakened to a severe cyclonic storm.

10 December

 03:00 UTC (8:30 a.m. IST) at   The IMD reports that Severe Cyclonic Storm Madi has re-intensified into a very severe cyclonic storm.
 12:00 UTC (5:30 p.m. IST) at   The IMD reports that Very Severe Cyclonic Storm Madi has weakened back into a severe cyclonic storm.
 21:00 UTC (2:30 a.m. IST 11 December) at   The IMD reports that Severe Cyclonic Storm Madi has weakened to a cyclonic storm.

11 December

 03:00 UTC (8:30 a.m. IST) at   The IMD reports that Cyclonic Storm Madi has degenerated to a deep depression.
 18:00 UTC (11:30 p.m. IST) at   The IMD reports that Deep Depression Madi has weakened to a depression.

12 December

 13:30 UTC (7:00 p.m. IST)  The IMD reports that Depression Madi has made landfall on the Tamil Nadu coast near Vedaranyam. It later crossed back into the Palk Strait.
 17:00 UTC (10:30 p.m. IST)  The IMD reports that Depression Madi has made landfall on the Tamil Nadu coast again near Tondi.

13 December

 00:00 UTC (5:30 a.m. IST)  The IMD reports that Depression Madi has weakened to a well-marked low pressure area over the southeast Arabian Sea near the Kerala coast.

See also 

 2013 North Indian Ocean cyclone season
 Timeline of the 2013 Atlantic hurricane season
 Timeline of the 2013 Pacific hurricane season
 Timeline of the 2013 Pacific typhoon season

Notes

References

External links 

 The IMD's preliminary reports on the 2013 North Indian Ocean cyclone season
 The JTWC's best track archive for the North Indian Ocean

2013 North Indian Ocean cyclone season
North Indian Ocean meteorological timelines
Tropical cyclones in 2013